The 2002–03 United Hockey League season was the 12th season of the United Hockey League (Colonial Hockey League before 1997), a North American minor professional league. Ten teams participated in the regular season and the Fort Wayne Komets won the league title.

Offseason
The Port Huron Border Cats ceased operations and were replaced with a new franchise named the Port Huron Beacons.

The Knoxville Speed folded after the team went bankrupt.

The Asheville Smoke folded despite efforts to save the team due to poor attendance and the Asheville Civic Center being outdated

The B.C. Icemen declared bankruptcy and was sold to local owners who launched an expansion team in the AHL named Binghamton Senators.

The New Haven Knights folded because their home arena, the New Haven Coliseum closed.

Regular season

Colonial Cup-Playoffs

External links
 Season 2002/03 on hockeydb.com 

United Hockey League seasons
UHL
UHL